Ravnik is a dispersed settlement in the hills west of Šentrupert in the historical region of Lower Carniola in Slovenia. The Municipality of Šentrupert is now included in the Southeast Slovenia Statistical Region.

References

External links
Ravnik at Geopedia

Populated places in the Municipality of Šentrupert